Lamhay is a Pakistani romantic drama television series, produced by Momina Duraid under their banner MD Productions. It premiered on Hum TV on 28 August 2018 replacing Tabeer. It stars Zara Noor Abbas and Shaz Khan in lead roles. The series got low ratings compared to Abbas's previous projects and ended after airing 22 episodes.

Plot 
Lamhay revolves around a foreign return Hashir and conservative eastern Aleena who by fate meet each other and fall in love.

Cast

Soundtrack 

The title song was sung by Waqar Ali. The music was composed by Waqar Ali and the lyrics were written by Sabir Zafar.

References

External links

Pakistani drama television series
2018 Pakistani television series debuts
2018 Pakistani television series endings
Urdu-language television shows
Hum TV original programming